In astronomical and geodetic calculations, Cracovians are a clerical convenience introduced in the 1930s by Tadeusz Banachiewicz for solving systems of linear equations by hand.

Cracovians introduced the idea of using the transpose of A, AT, and multiplying the columns of AT by the column x. This amounts to the definition of a new type of matrix multiplication denoted here by '∧'. Thus .

Since , the products  and  will generally be different; thus, Cracovian multiplication is non-associative. Cracovians are an example of a quasigroup.

Cracovians adopted a column-row convention for designating individual elements as opposed to the standard row-column convention of matrix analysis. This made manual multiplication easier, as one needed to follow two parallel columns (instead of a vertical column and a horizontal row in the matrix notation.) It also sped up computer calculations, because both factors' elements were used in a similar order, which was more compatible with the sequential access memory in computers of those times — mostly magnetic tape memory and drum memory. Use of Cracovians in astronomy faded as computers with bigger random access memory came into general use. Any modern reference to them is in connection with their non-associative multiplication.

In programming
In R the desired effect can be achieved via the crossprod() function. Specifically, the Cracovian product of matrices A and B can be obtained as crossprod(B, A).

References
Banachiewicz, T. (1955). Vistas in Astronomy, vol. 1, issue 1, pp 200–206.
Herget, Paul;  (1948, reprinted 1962).  The computation of orbits, University of Cincinnati Observatory (privately published).  Asteroid 1751 is named after the author.
 Kocinski, J. (2004). Cracovian Algebra, Nova Science Publishers. 

Astrometry
History of astronomy
Matrix theory